The USC Upstate Spartans are the athletic teams that represent the University of South Carolina Upstate, located in Spartanburg, South Carolina, in intercollegiate sports at the Division I level of the National Collegiate Athletic Association (NCAA), primarily competing in the Big South Conference since the 2018–19 academic year.

USC Upstate competes in fifteen intercollegiate varsity sports. Men's sports include baseball, basketball, cross country, golf, soccer, and track and field (indoor and outdoor); while women's sports include basketball, cross country, golf, soccer, softball, track and field (indoor and outdoor), and volleyball. Men's and women's tennis were discontinued at the end of the 2019–20 school year.

Conference affiliations 
NCAA
 Peach Belt Conference (1990–2007)
 ASUN Conference (2007–2018)
 Big South Conference (2018–present)

Varsity teams 
USC Upstate also sponsored both men's and women's tennis until 2019–20 when the programs were discontinued.

Notable alumni

Baseball 
 Chad Sobotka

Men's basketball 
 Torrey Craig
 Ty Greene

Men's soccer 
 Joel Bunting
 Calon Minors
 Troy Simon

References

External links